Kisima Airport is an airport in Kenya.

Location
Kisima Airport  is located in Kisima, a village in Samburu County in northwestern Kenya, near the town of Maralal, in the eastern part of the Loroghi Plateau.

The approximate geographic coordinates of this airport are:0° 57' 0.00"N, 36° 48' 0.00"E (Latitude:0.9500; Longitude:36.8000).

Overview
Kisima Airport is a small civilian airport, serving the village of Kisima and the neighboring town of Maralal.

Airlines and destinations
None at the moment.

See also
 Kenya Airports Authority
 Kenya Civil Aviation Authority
 List of airports in Kenya

References

External links
  Location of Kisima Airport At Google Maps
  Website of Kenya Airports Authority
 List of Airports In Kenya

Airports in Kenya
Airports in Rift Valley Province
Samburu County